This is a list of counts and dukes of Maine. The capital of Maine was Le Mans. In the thirteenth century it was annexed by France to the royal domain.

Dukes of Maine (duces Cenomannici)

 Charivius (fl. 723) – appears as dux in a document of 723. Controlled twelve counties and the Diocese of Le Mans
 Grifo (748–749) – given the twelve counties of Maine by his brother, Pepin the Short, as appeasement, but rebelled the next year.
 Charles the Younger (790–811) – given the ducatus Cenomannicus to govern by his father, Charlemagne.
 Lothair I (817–831) – given the ducatus as part of a division of the realm by his father, Louis the Pious.
 Pepin I (831–838) – given the ducatus as part of a re-division of the realm by his father, Louis the Pious.
 Charles the Bald (838–851) – given the ducatus on the death of Pepin by their father, Louis the Pious.
 Robert the Strong (851/3–856) – given Maine, Anjou, and Touraine as dux and missus dominicus. Rebelled in 856.
 Louis the Stammerer (856–858) – granted the twelve counties and a court at Le Mans by his father, Charles the Bald, until chased away by Breton rebels.

Counts of Maine

 Banzleibs (fl. 830s)
 Rorgon I (832–839)
 Gauzbert (839–849)
 Rorgon II (849–865)
 Gauzfrid (865–878)
 Reginald (878–885)
 Roger (886–893)
 Gauzlin II (893–895)
 Roger (restored) (895–898)
 Gauzlin III (898–900)
 Hugh I (900–950)
 Hugh II (950–992)
 Hugh III (992–1015)
 Herbert I Wakedog (1015–1032)
 Hugh IV (1036–1051)
 under Angevin rule (1051–1063)
 Herbert II (1058–1062)
 Walter of Mantes (1062–1063)
 Robert Curthose (1063–1069)
 Hugh V (1069–1093)
 Elias I (1093–1110), in opposition
 Eremburga and Fulk V of Anjou (1110–1126), in opposition
 Geoffrey of Anjou (1126–1151)
 Elias II (1151)
 Henry II of England (1151–1189)
 Henry the Young King (1169–1183)
 Richard the Lionheart (1189–1199)
 John Lackland (1199–1204)
 Arthur I, Duke of Brittany pretender (1199-1203)
 annexed by France in 1204
 John Tristan (1219–1232)
 Charles I (1246–1285)
 Charles II (1285–1290)
 Charles III (1290–1314)
 Philip (1314-1328)
 royal domain in 1328
 Louis I (1339–1384)
 Louis II (1384–1417)
 Louis III (1417–1434)
 René (1434–1441)
 Charles IV (1441–1472)
 Charles V (1480–1481)
 royal domain
 Charles VI (?–1611)
 Henry (1611–1621)
 Charles VII (1621–1631)
 Ferdinand (1631–1632)
 Charles VIII (1632–?)
 royal domain

Dukes of Maine (ducs du Maine)
In 1673, the title began to be used again. It was revived by Louis XIV for his first illegitimate son by his chief mistress, Françoise-Athénaïs, marquise de Montespan. He used it until his death and also founded the semi-royal house of Bourbon du Maine, named after his title.
 Louis Auguste, Duke of Maine (1673–1736)

Maine
 
 
Maine
Dukedoms of France
Maine